Korda is a surname. Notable people with the surname include:

 Alberto Korda (1928–2011), Cuban photographer
 Alexander Korda (1893–1956), Hungarian-born British film director and producer
 Chris Korda (born 1962), American musician; son of Michael
 Dezső Korda (1864–1919), Hungarian engineer, inventor of rotary capacitor
 Jessica Korda (born 1993), American golfer; daughter of Petr
 Michael Korda (born 1933), English-born American editor and writer
 Nelly Korda (born 1998), American golfer; daughter of Petr
 Paul Korda (1948-2020), English musician and actor
 Petr Korda (born 1968), Czech tennis player
 Sebastian Korda (born 2000), American tennis player; son of Petr
 Serena Korda (born 1979), British artist
 Vincent Korda (1897–1979), Hungarian-born British art director
 Zoltán Korda (1895–1961), Hungarian-born film director

See also
 Korda Studios (Hungary)
 Corda (disambiguation)